Gianfranco Da Rin (born 15 June 1935) is an Italian former ice hockey player. He competed in the men's tournaments at the 1956 Winter Olympics and the 1964 Winter Olympics.

References

External links
 

1935 births
Living people
Olympic ice hockey players of Italy
Ice hockey players at the 1956 Winter Olympics
Ice hockey players at the 1964 Winter Olympics
People from Cortina d'Ampezzo
Sportspeople from the Province of Belluno